David March (born 25 July 1979) is an English former professional rugby league footballer who played as a  in the 1990s, 2000s and 2010s.

Background
David March was born in Thornhill, West Yorkshire, and he is the twin brother of the rugby league footballer and coach; Paul March.

Career records
David March is second in Wakefield Trinity's "Most Consecutive Appearances" record list with 95 consecutive appearances between 2003 and 2006, this is the highest in the Super League era, he his behind Harry Wilkinson who had 96 consecutive appearances.

References

External links
(archived by web.archive.org) David March Wildcats Profile
(archived by web.archive.org) Profile at yorkcityknights.co.uk

1979 births
Living people
English rugby league players
Hunslet R.L.F.C. players
Keighley Cougars players
People from Thornhill, West Yorkshire
Rugby league five-eighths
Rugby league halfbacks
Rugby league hookers
Rugby league locks
Rugby league players from Dewsbury
English twins
Twin sportspeople
Wakefield Trinity players
York City Knights players